Abdul Haq Bin Seidu Osman (born 27 February 1987) is a Ghanaian footballer who plays for Sittingbourne.

Career

Early career 
Osman started his career at Hampton & Richmond Borough before he moved on to play at youth level for Watford, before signing for Maidenhead United. After leaving the Magpies, Osman then signed for Gretna in the summer of 2007, signing a 12-month contract with the Anvils, scoring one goal versus Motherwell. Osman was then a free agent after the Anvils entered administration and he attracted interest from a number of clubs, with Leeds United, Ipswich Town and Brighton all reported to be keen on him, as well as various clubs from Scotland.

Northampton Town 
In June 2008, Osman signed for Northampton Town after he failed a medical with Kilmarnock. On 22 September 2010, Osman netted the winning penalty-kick at Anfield Stadium, as the Cobblers knocked Liverpool out of the League Cup. In May 2011, along with seven other players, Osman was informed that his contract would not be renewed by the club.

Kerkyra 
In July 2011, Osman then went on trial at Greek Superleague club Kerkyra and signed a -year contract in August 2011.

Crewe Alexandra 
On 25 July 2012, Osman then joined Crewe Alexandra on a two-year contract.

Partick Thistle 
After being released by the Railwaymen in 2014, Osman went on trial with Partick Thistle, before signing for the Harry Wraggs on 23 July 2014. Osman scored his first goal for the Firhill club on 13 September 2014, in a 3–1 win versus Inverness Caledonian Thistle, heading in from a corner to give his club a 2–1 lead. On 15 May 2015, Osman signed a new one-year contract with the Harry Wraggs, keeping him at the club until the end of the 2015-16 season. Osman was then appointed club captain at the beginning of the 2015–16 season. Osman was then sent-off in Thistle's 2–1 win versus St Johnstone. Thistle were relegated via the play-offs at the end of the 2017-18 season. Following the club's relegation, Osman was one of many players released by Thistle.

Lamia 
On 17 August 2018, Osman returned to the Superleague, signing a contract with Lamia.

Falkirk 
On 2 January 2019,  after being released by Lamia during November 2018, Osman signed for Scottish Championship club Falkirk on 2 January 2019 until the end of the 2018-19 season.

Queen of the South 
On 4 October 2019, after training with Dumfries club Queen of the South for a few weeks, Osman signed a short-term contract until 11 January 2020 and debuted against his former club Partick Thistle, as a second-half substitute. On 10 January 2020, Osman extended his contract with Queens until 30 June 2020.

Dartford 
On 2 October 2020, Osman joined Dartford. On 27 November 2020, Dartford confirmed Osman had left the club to return home to his family in Scotland.

Brechin City 
On 20 January 2021, Osman returned to Scottish football and signed with League Two side Brechin City.

Walton Casuals
Osman joined Walton Casuals at the start of the 2021–22 season.

Sittingbourne
On July 7 2022, Osman joined Sittingbourne ahead of the start of the 2022–23 season.

Career statistics

Honours
Crewe Alexandra
 Football League Trophy: 2012-13

References

External links
Abdul Osman player profile at ntfc.co.uk

Profile at Guardian's Stats Centre

1987 births
Living people
Footballers from Accra
Ghanaian footballers
Association football midfielders
Maidenhead United F.C. players
Gretna F.C. players
Northampton Town F.C. players
A.O. Kerkyra players
Crewe Alexandra F.C. players
Sittingbourne F.C. players
National League (English football) players
Scottish Premier League players
English Football League players
Super League Greece players
Southern Football League players
Ghanaian emigrants to England
Ghanaian expatriate footballers
Expatriate footballers in England
Expatriate footballers in Scotland
Expatriate footballers in Greece
Partick Thistle F.C. players
Scottish Professional Football League players
Falkirk F.C. players
Queen of the South F.C. players
Brechin City F.C. players
Walton Casuals F.C. players